Moskwa is a surname. Notable people with this surname include:

 Jacek Moskwa (born 1948), Polish journalist
 Kornelia Moskwa (born 1996), Polish volleyball player
 Robert Moskwa (born 1965), Polish actor
 Stefan Moskwa (1935–2004), Polish Roman Catholic priest

See also
 
 Moskva (disambiguation)

Polish-language surnames